Hartley was an electoral district of the Legislative Assembly in the Australian state of New South Wales, created in 1859 in the Lithgow area and named after the town of Hartley, near Lithgow. It replaced part of Cook and Westmoreland. From 1891 to 1894, it elected two members. In 1920, with the introduction of proportional representation, it was absorbed into Bathurst, along with Orange. It was recreated in 1927 and abolished in 1968 and partly replaced by Blue Mountains.

Members for Hartley

Election results

References

Former electoral districts of New South Wales
1859 establishments in Australia
Constituencies established in 1859
1920 disestablishments in Australia
Constituencies disestablished in 1920
1927 establishments in Australia
Constituencies established in 1927
1968 disestablishments in Australia
Constituencies disestablished in 1968